Mohamed Fellag (born 31 March 1950 in Azeffoun, Tizi Ouzou) is an Algerian comedian, writer, humorist, and actor. In 1958, at the height of the Algerian war of independence, his father took him and his younger brother, for their safety, to stay with an aunt in Beni-Messous (then a very small village near Algiers) where they went to primary school. He did his secondary studies in Tizi-Ouzou (Ecole Jeanmaire and CEG.) He entered the School of Dramatic Arts of Algiers in 1968 and stayed there for four  years performing in several theatres throughout Algeria.

Career
From 1978 to 1985, he participated in several theatrical productions, before returning to Algeria in 1985 to join the National Theatre of Algeria to play the principal role in Eduardo De Filippo's production of L’Art de la Comédie. In 1986, he played in Ray Bradbury's Le Costume Blanc Couleur Glace à la Noix de Coco and created Les Aventures de Tchop, his first one-man show. He acted in a number of movies and TV shows during the period of turbulence in Algeria during the late 80s and early 90s. In 1989 he wrote the play Cocktail Khorotov and SOS Labès in 1990. He followed this in 1992 with Un bateau pour l'Australie-Babor Australia. In 1995, after a bomb explosion during one of his presentations, he moved first to Tunisia and then to France. There he found success on stage with his plays that confronted the social difficulties of France. He has appeared in numerous films, particularly since 2005, including the Oscar-nominated Monsieur Lazhar, for which he won a Canadian Genie Award for Best Actor in a Leading Role.

Awards and prizes
 Prix du Syndicat de la Critique (Critics' Circle Award) – 1998
 Prince Claus Award - 1999
 Raymond Devos prize – 2003
 Prix de la SACD de la Francophonie – 2003

Plays
 Cocktail Khorotov, 1989
 SOS Labes, 1990
 Un Bateau pour l'Australie, 1992
 Djurdjurassic Bled, 1998
 La Casbah, 2003 with Biyouna
 Le Dernier chameau, 2004.
 L'ère des Ninjas et Djurdjurassic (Les Dinosaures) in the théâtre of gymnase Marie-Bell, 2007

Publications
Les Aventures de Tchop, 1965
Cocktail Khorotov, 1989
SOS Labes, 1990
Le Balcon de Djamila
Djurdjurassique bled, 1999
Rue des petites daurades, novel, 2001
C'est à Alger, 2002
Comment réussir un bon petit couscous, 2003
Le Dernier chameau
L'Allumeur de Rêves Berbères, 2007
Tous les Algériens sont des mécaniciens, 2009

Filmography
1983: Liberté, la nuit, by Philippe Garrel
1990: De Hollywood à Tamanrasset
1998: Le Gone du Chaâba, by Christophe Ruggia
2001: Inch'Allah dimanche, by Yamina Benguigui
2002: Fleurs de sang, by 
2003: Momo mambo, by Laïla Marrakchi
2005: Voisins, voisines, by Malik Chibane
2005: Rue des figuiers, by Yasmina Yahiaoui
2006: Michou d'Auber, by Thomas Gilou
2007: L'Ennemi intime, by Florent Emilio Siri
2009: The Barons
2010: Top Floor, Left Wing
2010: Bacon on the Side
2011: The Rabbi's Cat, by Joann Sfar
2011: Monsieur Lazhar, by Philippe Falardeau
2012: What the Day Owes the Night, by Alexandre Arcady

References

External links
 Mohand's personal website

1950 births
Living people
People from Azeffoun
Kabyle people
Algerian male comedians
Algerian emigrants to France
Algerian dramatists and playwrights
Algerian male stage actors
20th-century Algerian male actors
21st-century Algerian male actors
Algerian male film actors
Algerian male television actors
Algerian stand-up comedians
Best Actor Genie and Canadian Screen Award winners